The 2020 Women's British Open was played from 20 to 23 August in Scotland at Royal Troon Golf Club. It was the 44th Women's British Open, the 20th as a major championship on the LPGA Tour, and the first at Royal Troon Golf Club. The tournament was played behind closed doors due to the COVID-19 pandemic in the United Kingdom. It was the first championship held under a renewed sponsorship agreement with AIG; the deal involved the rebranding of the championship, removing the word "British", with the event titled as the 2020 AIG Women's Open.

The championship was won by world number 304 Sophia Popov, by two strokes from Thidapa Suwannapura. It was her first major tournament victory. Popov, a professional since 2014 and member of the second-tier Symetra Tour since 2016, had never previously won on any of the major tours, winning her first events on a mini-tour in Arizona earlier in 2020. She qualified for the Women's Open by means of a high finish at the LPGA Tour's Marathon Classic at the start of August.

Course layout

Field
The field is 144 players. Most players earn exemptions based on past performance on the Ladies European Tour, the LPGA Tour, previous major championships, or with a high ranking in the Women's World Golf Rankings, with the rest of the field normally gaining entry by successfully competing in qualifying tournaments open to any female golfer, professional or amateur, with a low handicap. In 2020 there were no such tournaments due to the COVID-19 pandemic.

Qualification criteria for the 2020 Women's British Open were as follows:

1. Winners of the Women's British Open, aged 60 or younger at the scheduled end of the championship, provided they are still active members of a recognised tour.

2. The top 10 finishers and ties from the 2019 Women's British Open.

3. The top 15 on the final 2019 LET Order of Merit.

4. The top 5 on the 2020 LET Order of Merit not already exempt as of 29 June.

5. The top 30 on the final 2019 LPGA Money List.

6. The top 35 on the 2020 LPGA Prioity List not already exempt under criteria 5. as of 29 June.

7. The top 5 on the 2020 LPGA Money List not already exempt as of 29 June.

8. The top 30 in the Women's World Golf Rankings as of 16 March.

9. Winners of the 2019 JLPGA Money List.

10. The top 5 on the final 2019 JLPGA Money List not already exempt.

11. Winners of the 2019 KLPGA Money List.

10. The top 5 on the 2020 KLPGA Money List not already exempt as of 29 June.

12. Winners of any recognised LET or LPGA Tour events in the 2020 calendar year.

13. Winners of the last five editions of the U.S. Women's Open

14. Winners of the last five editions of the ANA Inspiration

15. Winners of the last five editions of the Women's PGA Championship

16. Winners of the last five editions of The Evian Championship

17. The leading five (not otherwise exempt) in the 2020 Marathon Classic

18. The leading three (not otherwise exempt) in the 2020 Aberdeen Standard Investments Ladies Scottish Open

19. The 2020 Women's Amateur Asia-Pacific champion, 2020 Womens Amateur Championship champion, 2019 U.S. Women's Amateur champion, 2020 European Ladies Amateur Championship champion, the 2019 Mark H. McCormack Medal winner, and the highest ranked women in the World Amateur Golf Ranking from Great Britain and Ireland as of week 25, and provided they are still amateurs at the time of the Championship.

20. Any player who did not compete in the previous year's Women's British Open due to maternity, who subsequently received an extension of membership for the maternity from the player's home tour in the previous year, provided she was otherwise qualified to compete in the previous year's Women's British Open.

21. Remaining places filled by players not already exempt from:
a) the 2020 Aberdeen Standard Investments Ladies Scottish Open
i) in finishing order for those making the cut, with ties determined by order of Rolex Ranking prior to the start of the tournament, then card playoff.
ii) in order of Rolex Ranking prior to the start of the tournament for those not making the cut.
b) the Rolex Rankings as of 16 March.

Nationalities in the field

Past champions in the field

Made the cut

Missed the cut

Round summaries

First round
Thursday, 20 August 2020

American Amy Olson held a three stroke lead at the end of the first round after recording a 4 under par round of 67. In tough scoring conditions due to strong winds, Marina Alex and Sophia Popov were the only other two other players to finish under par. Ten players returned even par rounds to lie a stroke further back, including 2009 champion Catriona Matthew and two-time LPGA major winner Anna Nordqvist.

Second round
Friday, 21 August 2020

Windy conditions continued throughout the second round which made for difficult scoring again. Daniela Holmqvist took a one stroke lead at the halfway stage following a one under par round of 70; by the end of the day she was the only player in the field under par. In joint second, at even par, were Austin Ernst and Sophia Popov after rounds of 70 and 72 respectively. The best rounds of the day (69, two under par) came from Minjee Lee, who climbed into a tie for fourth at one over par, and Inbee Park, who finished in a tie for 17th place at four over par. First round leader Amy Olson was one of many who struggled, returning a ten over par round of 81 to fall back into a tie for 33rd place.

The cut came at nine over par. Among those to miss the cut were the defending champion from 2019, Hinako Shibuno; 2017 champion In-Kyung Kim;  2013 champion Stacy Lewis, who had won the Ladies Scottish Open the previous week; and Rose Ladies Series champion Charley Hull.

Third round
Saturday, 22 August 2020

Sophia Popov moved into a three stroke lead at four under par after returning the joint best score of the day, a four under par round of 67. Also with 67 was Katherine Kirk, who climbed into a tie for tenth place, seven strokes behind Popov. Tied for second at one under par were Minjee Lee and Thidapa Suwannapura, both recording two under par rounds of 69 on Saturday. Further back, three players were tied at one over par, and three more at two over par. Daniela Holmqvist, who had held the lead at the halfway stage dropped down the leaderboard into a tie for 21st place after a six over par round of 77.

Final round
Sunday, 23 August 2020

After a bogey on the opening hole, overnight leader Sophia Popov bounced back with three birdies in the next five holes to retain the lead going into the final nine holes. Her nearest challenger was Thidapa Suwannapura, who birdied four holes in a row from the fourth to get within one stroke, with Minjee Lee a further two strokes behind. Bogeys by Suwannapura on the 11th and 13th holes extended Popov's lead to three strokes, and when Popov birdied both the 15th and 16th holes she led by four with just two holes to play. Popov bogeyed the last to finish two strokes ahead of Suwannapura and four clear of Lee.

2015 champion Inbee Park returned the joint lowest round of the day, and the championship, with a five under par round of 66 to climb up to fourth place at one under par. Also with a round of 66 was Ally McDonald, who finished tied for 22nd place at six over par. Lindsey Weaver, who had been in a tie for fourth place after each of the opening three rounds and had chosen to play without a caddie as a result of COVID-19 related restrictions, fell away on Sunday with a four over par round of 75 to finish tied for 19th place.

Scorecard
Final round

Cumulative tournament scores, relative to par
{|class="wikitable" span = 50 style="font-size:85%;
|-
|style="background: Red;" width=10|
|Eagle
|style="background: Pink;" width=10|
|Birdie
|style="background: PaleGreen;" width=10|
|Bogey
|style="background: Green;" width=10|
|Double bogey
|}
Source:

References

External links

Coverage on the LPGA Tour site
Coverage on the Ladies European Tour

Women's British Open
Golf tournaments in Scotland
British Open
Women's British Open
Women's British Open